Spinodiadelia spinipennis is a species of beetle in the family Cerambycidae, and the only species in the genus Spinodiadelia. It was described by Breuning in 1960.

References

Desmiphorini
Beetles described in 1960
Monotypic beetle genera